Chelonodontops pleurospilus, commonly known as the blaasop beauty, is a species of pufferfish in the family Tetraodontidae. It is a marine species endemic to South Africa, where it ranges from the mouth of the Xora River to Durban. It is demersal and found in shallow water (1–10 m depth).

It reaches 20 cm (7.9 inches) in total length. It is poisonous and not suitable for human consumption.

References 

Tetraodontidae
Fish of the Indian Ocean
Endemic fish of South Africa
Marine fish of South Africa
Fish described in 1919
Taxa named by Charles Tate Regan